The Canada Deposit Insurance Corporation (CDIC) is a Canadian federal Crown Corporation created by Parliament in 1967 to provide deposit insurance to depositors in Canadian commercial banks and savings institutions. CDIC insures Canadians' deposits held at Canadian banks (and other member institutions) up to C$100,000 in case of a bank failure. CDIC automatically insures many types of savings against the failure of a financial institution. However, the bank must be a CDIC member and not all savings are insured. CDIC is also Canada's resolution authority for banks, federally regulated credit unions, trust and loan companies as well as associations governed by the Cooperative Credit Associations Act that take deposits.

History 

The Canada Deposit Insurance Corporation was created 4 March 1967 (under Schedule III, Part 1 of the Financial Administration Act and Canada Deposit Insurance Corporation Act).  It is similar to the Federal Deposit Insurance Corporation in the United States. Since 1967, 43 financial institutions have failed in Canada and all 43 were members of CDIC. There have been no failures since 1996. At 31 December 2017, member institutions numbered 82, according to CDIC's Summary of the Corporate Plan, 2018/19 to 2022/2023.

The roots of the CDIC can be traced back to the 19th century, such as the Upper Canada's financial problems of 1866, the North American panic of 1873 and the 1923 failure of Toronto's Home Bank, symbolized today by Casa Loma. Historically in Canada regional risk has always been spread nationally within each large bank, unlike the uneven geography of US unit banking, layered with savings & loans of regional or national size, who in turn disperse their risk through investors. The Canadian banking system is regulated in part by the Office of the Superintendent of Financial Institutions who can, in an extreme case, close a financial institution. Alongside Canada's mortgage rules, the risk of bank failures similar to the US are slim, but not impossible.

The original amount of insurance per eligible deposit account was $20,000. This was raised to $60,000 in 1983. As of 2005, CDIC covers $100,000 in eligible deposits per insured category at each CDIC member institution in the event of a failure.

On 22 June 2017, CDIC was formally designated as the resolution authority for Canada's largest banks, a recognition of CDIC's role in handling the failure of its member institutions. CDIC has a number of tools to assist or resolve a failing member institution.

Coverage
Insurance is restricted to CDIC member institutions, and covers $100,000 in certain types of deposits, such as savings accounts and chequing accounts, guaranteed investment certificates (GICs) and other term deposits with an original term to maturity of five years or less, money orders, travellers' cheques and bank drafts issued by CDIC members and cheques certified by CDIC members, and debentures issued by loan companies that are CDIC members. Eligible deposits are insured separately in each of seven categories:

 in one name
 in more than one name
 in an RRSP 
 in an RRIF
 in a TFSA 
 in trust
 for paying taxes on mortgaged properties

A key characteristic of CDIC deposit protection is separate coverage. Given that each deposit category is protected separately, depositors can benefit from protection far in excess of $100,000 (e.g. they are protected for $100,000 in each of seven categories).

Most credit unions (and caisses populaires in Quebec or New Brunswick) are not insured federally, because they are created under provincial charters and backed by provincial insurance corporations which generally follow the CDIC model. Federal credit unions, such as the UNI Financial Cooperation caisse in New Brunswick, are incorporated under federal charters and are members of CDIC. ATB Financial, a financial institution owned by the Government of Alberta, is insured directly by the Alberta provincial government rather than through a federal or provincial insurance corporation.

Funds in foreign banks operating in Canada are not covered. Deposits in foreign currencies, such as United States dollars, are also not insured even if they are held by a registered CDIC financial institution. Guaranteed Investment Certificates with a term longer than 5 years are also not insured. Some funds in Registered Retirement Savings Plans or registered retirement income funds at a bank may not be covered if they are invested in mutual funds or held in specific instruments like debentures issued by government or corporations. The general principle is to cover reasonable deposits and savings, but not deposits deliberately positioned to take risks for gain, such as mutual funds or stocks.

Current financial position
According to CDIC's Quarterly Financial Report at 31 December 2017, CDIC protects $774 billion CAD in insured deposits. CDIC's ex ante funding level is $4.2 billion, representing 55 basis points of insured deposits.

List of financial collapses since 1967
Commonwealth Trust Company 1970
Security Trust Company Limited 1972
Astra Trust Company 1980
District Trust Company 1982
AMIC Mortgage Investment Corporation 1983
Crown Trust Company 1983
Fidelity Trust Company 1983
Greymac Mortgage Corporation 1983
Greymac Trust Company 1983
Seaway Mortgage Corporation 1983
Seaway Trust Company 1983
Northguard Mortgage Corporation 1984
CCB Mortgage Investment Corporation 1985
Canadian Commercial Bank 1985
Continental Trust Company 1985
London Loan Limited 1985
Northland Bank 1985
Pioneer Trust Company 1985
Western Capital Trust Company 1985
Bank of British Columbia 1986
Bank of British Columbia Mortgage Corporation 1986
Columbia Trust Company 1986
North West Trust Company 1987
Principal Savings & Trust Company 1987
Financial Trust Company 1988
Settlers Savings and Mortgage Corporation 1990
Bank of Credit and Commerce Canada 1991
Saskatchewan Trust Company 1991
Standard Loan Company 1991
Standard Trust Company 1991
Shoppers Trust Company 1992
Central Guaranty Mortgage Corporation 1992
Central Guaranty Trust Company 1992
First City Trust Company 1992
First City Mortgage Company 1992
Dominion Trust Company 1993
Prenor Trust Company of Canada 1993
Confederation Trust Company 1994
Monarch Trust Company 1994
Income Trust Company 1995
North American Trust Company 1995
NAL Mortgage Company 1995
Security Home Mortgage Corporation 1996

See also

Deposit insurance
Banking in Canada
Federal Deposit Insurance Corporation (U.S. counterpart)

Related agencies and programs
Canadian Credit Union Association
Canadian Investor Protection Fund, a similar program for investment (stocks, bonds) accounts

References

External links

Canada Deposit Insurance Corporation Act (R.S.C., 1985, c. C-3)
Financial Administration Act (R.S.C., 1985, c. F-11)

Canadian companies established in 1967
Banks established in 1967
1967 establishments in Ontario
Banks of Canada
Deposit Insurance Corporation
Companies based in Ottawa
Financial regulatory authorities of Canada
Federal departments and agencies of Canada
Deposit insurance